The Diocese of Killaloe may refer either to a Roman Catholic or a Church of Ireland (Anglican) diocese, in Ireland.

Roman Catholic diocese

The Diocese of Killaloe is the second largest Roman Catholic diocese in Ireland.

It comprises the greater part of County Clare, a large portion of County Tipperary, and parts of Counties Offaly, Laois and Limerick, stretching from Birr Parish in the north to Toomevara Parish in the East and to Cross Parish on the Loop Head peninsula in the south-west of the diocese. 

The Pro-Cathedral for the Catholic Diocese is in Ennis.

Killaloe is a suffragan diocese of Cashel.

Bishop Fintan Monahan is the current Bishop of Killaloe.

Church of Ireland Diocese

In the Church of Ireland divisions, the diocese is now part of the United Diocese of Limerick and Killaloe. The pre-Reformation St. Flannan's Cathedral is the Cathedral.

The present bishop is the Right Reverend Kenneth Kearon.

See also
 Bishop of Killaloe
 Bishop of Killaloe and Kilfenora
 Bishop of Killaloe and Clonfert
 Bishop of Limerick and Killaloe

References

External links 
Catholic Encyclopedia Entry
Official website for Killaloe Catholic Diocese
Official website for Limerick and Killaloe Anglican Diocese
Catholic-Hierarchy site for Diocese

Diocese of Killaloe